Inside Nazi Germany is a 1938 short documentary film about Nazi Germany directed by Jack Glenn. It is an episode of the newsreel series The March of Time.

In 1993, Inside Nazi Germany was deemed "culturally significant" by the Library of Congress and selected for preservation in the United States National Film Registry.

References

External links

 Genzlinger, Neil, "'March of Time' Documentary Series Is Revisited"; The New York Times, September 2, 2010
 Inside Nazi Germany at the Library of Congress
 "Movie of the Week: The March of Time — Inside Nazi Germany; Life, January 31, 1938

1938 documentary films
1938 films
United States National Film Registry films
Black-and-white documentary films
American short documentary films
RKO Pictures short films
The March of Time films
Newsreels
Documentary films about Nazi Germany
American black-and-white films
1930s short documentary films
1930s English-language films
1930s American films